This is a list of golf courses designed by Donald Ross (November 23, 1872 – April 26, 1948). He designed courses in Canada and the States.

This is not a comprehensive list. It is sorted by country, state/province, city, and then course.

Canada

Manitoba
Elmhurst Golf and Country Club, Winnipeg
 Pine Ridge Golf Club, Winnipeg
 St. Charles Country Club, Winnipeg

New Brunswick
 Westfield Golf and Country Club, Grand Bay-Westfield
 Riverside Country Club, Rothesay

Nova Scotia
 Brightwood Golf and Country Club, Dartmouth
 White Point Golf Course, Queens County

Ontario
 Essex Golf and Country Club, Windsor
 Rosedale Golf Club, Toronto
 Roseland Golf and Curling Club, Windsor

United States

Alabama 
 Birmingham Country Club East and West Courses, Birmingham
 Country Club of Mobile, Mobile
 Mountain Brook Club, Birmingham

California 
 Peninsula Golf & Country Club, San Mateo

Colorado 
 Broadmoor Golf Club, East Course, (Holes 1-6,16-18), West Course, (Holes 1-4, 13-18) Colorado Springs
 Wellshire Golf Course, Denver
 Lakewood County Club, Lakewood
 Trinidad Municipal Golf Course, Trinidad

Connecticut 
 Shennecossett Golf Course, Groton
 Country Club of Waterbury, Waterbury
 Wampanoag Country Club, West Hartford
 Birchwood Country Club, Westport

Florida 
 Belleair Country Club, Belleair
 Biltmore Golf Club, Coral Gables
 Bobby Jones Golf Course, Sarasota
 Bradenton Country Club, Bradenton
 Clewiston Country Club, Clewiston, Florida
 The Country Club of Orlando, Orlando
 Daytona Beach Golf Course (South Course), Daytona Beach
 Delray Beach Golf Course, Delray Beach
 Dunedin Country Club, Dunedin
 Florida Country Club, Jacksonville
 Fort George Island Golf Club, Jacksonville
 Fort Myers Country Club, Fort Myers
 Granada Golf Course, Coral Gables
 Gulf Stream Golf Club, Delray Beach
 Hollywood Beach Golf Course, Hollywood, Florida
 Hyde Park Golf Club, Jacksonville
 Keystone Heights Golf & Country Club, Keystone Heights
 Mark Bostic Golf Course, Gainesville
 Lake Wales Country Club, Lake Wales
 Mayfair Country Club, Sanford
 Melbourne Golf Club, Melbourne
 New Smyrna Beach Golf Course, New Smyrna Beach
 Palatka Municipal Golf Course, Palatka
 Palm Beach Country Club, Palm Beach
 Palma Ceia Golf Club, Tampa
 Palma Sola Golf Club, Bradenton
 Panama Country Club, Lynn Haven
 Ponce de Leon Resort & Country Club, St. Augustine
 Punta Gorda Country Club, Punta Gorda
 Riviera Country Club, Coral Gables
 Sara Bay Country Club, Sarasota
 San Jose Country Club, Jacksonville
 Seminole Golf Club, Juno Beach
 St. Augustine Links - South, St. Augustine
 Timuquana Country Club, Jacksonville

Georgia 

 Athens Country Club, Athens
 East Lake Golf Club, Atlanta
 Augusta Country Club, Augusta
 Forest Hills Golf Club, Augusta
 Brunswick Country Club, Brunswick
 Bacon Park Municipal Golf Course (original 18),  Savannah
 Country Club of Columbus, Columbus
 Highland Country Club LaGrange, Georgia Front 9
 Savannah Country Club, Savannah
 Washington Wilkes Country Club, Washington

Illinois 

 Beverly Country Club, Chicago
 Evanston Golf Club, Skokie
 Skokie Country Club, Glencoe
 Bob O'Link Golf Club, Highland Park
 Old Elm Club, Highland Park
 Exmoor Country Club, Highland Park
 Northmoor Country Club, Highland Park
 Calumet Country Club, Homewood
 Ravisloe Country Club, Homewood
 Oak Park Country Club, River Grove
 LaGrange Country Club, LaGrange
 Indian Hill Club, Winnetka

Indiana 
 Donald Ross Course, French Lick Resort Casino, French Lick
 Broadmoor Country Club, Indianapolis
 Donald Ross Golf Course front nine, Fort Wayne

Iowa 
 Cedar Rapids Country Club, Cedar Rapids

Kansas 
 Shawnee Country Club, Topeka

Kentucky
 Idle Hour Country Club, Lexington

Maryland
 Fountain Head Country Club, Hagerstown
 Country Club At Woodmore, Mitchelville Maryland
Actually Ross designed the old Prince George’s Country Club Golf Course in Kentland. It was originally known as Beaver Dam. In approx 1980 Prince George’s Country Club moved to Mitchellville and the name was changed to Woodmore. The Woodmore Course was designed by Arnold Palmer.

Maine 
 Lucerne Golf Course, Dedham
 Portland Country Club, Falmouth
 Lake Kezar Country Club Lovell
 Augusta Country Club, Manchester
 Cape Neddick Country Club, Cape Neddick (York)
 Penobscot Valley Country Club, Orono
 Poland Spring Resort Golf Course (redesigned and expanded), Poland Spring
 York country club, york
 Biddeford Saco Country Club, Saco
 Blue Hill Country Club, Blue Hill

Massachusetts 
Essex County Club, Manchester-by-the-Sea -1893
 Andover Country Club, Andover
 Ellinwood Country Club, Athol
 Woodland Golf Club, Auburndale
 Belmont Country Club, Belmont
 William J. Devine Memorial Golf Course, Boston (re-design)
 Littlputt Links, Brookline (Indoor miniature golf)
 Kernwood Country Club, Salem
 Fresh Pond Golf Course, Cambridge
 Ponkapoag Golf Course No. 1, Canton
 Ponkapoag Golf Course No. 2 (Front 9 only), Canton
 Cohasset Golf Club, Cohasset
 Concord Country Club, Concord 
 Oak Hill Country Club, Fitchburg
 Framingham Country Club, Framingham
 Wyckoff Country Club, Holyoke (partial, 5 fairways, 7 greens after re-design)
 Hyannisport Club, Hyannis Port
 George Wright Golf Course, Hyde Park
 Greenock Country Club, Lee
 Longmeadow Country Club, Longmeadow
 Ludlow Country Club, Ludlow
 Merrimack Valley Golf Club, Methuen
 Whaling City Golf Club (Front 9), New Bedford
 Brae Burn Country Club, Newton
 Charles River Country Club, Newton
 Newton Commonwealth, Newton
 North Andover Country Club, North Andover
 Oyster Harbors Osterville
 Wianno Golf Club Osterville 
 Salem Country Club, Peabody
 Petersham Country Club, Petersham
 Country Club of Pittsfield, Pittsfield
 Orchards Golf Club, South Hadley
Plymouth Country Club Plymouth
 Cohasse Country Club, Southbridge
 Vesper Country Club, Tyngsborough
 Oakley Country Club, Watertown
 Sandy Burr Country Club, Wayland
 Wachusett Country Club, West Boylston
 Leo J. Martin Memorial Golf Course, Weston
 Weston Golf Club, Weston
 Whitinsville Golf Club, Whitinsville
 Winchester Country Club, Winchester
 Worcester Country Club, Worcester
 Bass River Golf Course, Yarmouth
 Pocasset Golf Club, Pocasset
 Springfield Country Club, Springfield
 Tekoa Country Club Westfield
 Winchendon Golf Club (Winchendon, Massachusetts)
 Southwick Country Club Southwick, Massachusetts
 Tatnuck Country Club, Worcester

Michigan 
 Chandler Park Detroit, Michigan
 Barton Hills Country Club, Ann Arbor
 Oakland Hills Country Club, Bloomfield Hills
 Dearborn Country Club, Dearborn
 Warren Valley Golf Club, Dearborn Heights
 Detroit Golf Club, Detroit
 Rogell Golf Course, Detroit
 Elk Rapids Golf Club, Elk Rapids
 Franklin Hills Country Club, Franklin
 Grosse Ile Golf and Country Club, Grosse Ile
 Highlands Golf Course, Grand Rapids (Closed)
 Kent Country Club, Grand Rapids
 Rackham Golf Course, Huntington Woods
 Shadow Ridge Golf Course, Ionia
 Monroe Golf and Country Club, Monroe
 Muskegon Country Club, Muskegon, Michigan
 Western Golf & Country Club, Redford
 St. Clair Golf Club, St. Clair

Minnesota 
 Cloquet Country Club, Cloquet
 Northland Country Club, Duluth
 Interlachen Country Club, Edina
 The Minikahda Club, Minneapolis
 Woodhill Country Club, Wayzata
 Minneapolis Golf Club, St Louis Park
 White Bear Yacht Club, White Bear Lake

Mississippi 
 Great Southern Golf Club, Gulfport not a Donald Ross course, architect was Charles Nieman

Missouri 
Hillcrest Country Club, Kansas City Hillcrest Country Club is a private country club in Kansas City, Missouri.  The course was designed by Donald J. Ross beginning in 1912 and opened for play in 1916. Constructed on the highest point of the County it was aptly named Hillcrest.  This championship layout measures 6,763 yards and has played host to a number of large tournaments over the years.

New Hampshire 
 Bald Peak Colony Club, Melvin Village
 Bethlehem Country Club, Bethlehem
 Maplewood Golf Club, Bethlehem
 Mount Washington Hotel (Mount Washington Course), Bretton Woods
 The Balsams Grand Resort Hotel (The Panorama Golf Course), Dixville Notch
 Crotched Mountain Golf Club (first 9 holes), Francestown
 Carter Country Club, Lebanon
 Manchester Country Club, Bedford 
 Kingswood Golf Club, Wolfeboro 
 Lake Sunapee Country Club, New London
 Wentworth By The Sea Country Club, Rye

New Jersey 
 Seaview Marriott Resort (Bay Course), Absecon
 Riverton Country Club (1900), Cinnaminson
 Plainfield Country Club, Edison
 River Vale Country Club (1931), River Vale
 Knickerbocker Country Club (1914), Tenafly
 Mountain Ridge Country Club, West Caldwell
 Deal Golf Club, Deal
 Echo Lake Country Club, Westfield
 Crestmont Country Club, West Orange
 Montclair Golf Club (1920), West Orange, New Jersey

New York 

 The Sagamore Golf Course, Bolton Landing
 Chautauqua Golf Club-Lake Course, Chautauqua
 Siwanoy Country Club, Bronxville
 North Fork Country Club, Cutchogue
 Mark Twain Golf Course, Elmira
 Glens Falls Country Club, Glens Falls
 Irondequoit Country Club, Pittsford (near Rochester)
 Monroe Golf Club, Pittsford
 Oak Hill Country Club (East & West), Pittsford
 Brook Lea Country Club, Rochester
 Country Club of Rochester, Brighton
 Teugega Country Club, Rome
 Bellevue Country Club, Syracuse
 Tupper Lake Country Club, Tupper Lake
 Country Club of Buffalo, Williamsville
 Rip Van Winkle Country Club, Palenville
 Thendara Golf Club Front Nine, Thendara
 Whippoorwill Club, Armonk
 Schroon Lake Municipal Golf Club, Schroon Lake
 Lake Pleasant Golf Club, Lake Pleasant

North Carolina 
 Country Club of Asheville, Asheville
 Asheboro Municipal Golf Course,  Asheboro
 Asheville Municipal Golf Club, Asheville
 Grove Park Inn Golf Club, Asheville
 Biltmore Forest Country Club, Biltmore Forest
 Black Mountain Municipal Golf Course, Black Mountain NC
 Alamance Country Club, Burlington
 Carolina Golf Club, Charlotte
 Charlotte Country Club, Charlotte
 Myers Park Country Club, Charlotte
 Hope Valley Country Club, Durham
 Highland Country Club, Fayetteville
 Stryker Golf Course, Fort Bragg
 Overhills Golf Club, Percy Rockefeller Estate now on Fort Bragg
 Greensboro Country Club, Greensboro
 Sedgefield Country Club, Greensboro
 Hendersonville Country Club, Hendersonville
 Highlands Country Club, Highlands
 High Point Country Club, High Point
 Linville Golf Club, Linville
 Lenoir Golf Club, Lenoir
 Pinecrest Country Club, Lumberton
 Lake Lure Municipal Golf Course (9 Holes), Lake Lure, North Carolina
 Monroe Country Club (The Front 9 Holes), Monroe
 Mooresville Golf Course (The Front 9 Holes), Mooresville
 Mimosa Hills Country Club, Morganton
 New Bern Golf and Country Club, New Bern
 Catawba Country Club, Newton
Pinehurst No. 1, Pinehurst
 Pinehurst No. 2, Pinehurst
Pinehurst No. 3, Pinehurst
 Raleigh Country Club, Raleigh
 Pennrose Park Country Club, Reidsville
 Roaring Gap Country Club, Roaring Gap
 Richmond Pines Country Club, Rockingham
 Benvenue Country Club, Rocky Mount
 Country Club of Salisbury, Salisbury
 Sanford Golf Club, Sanford
 Mid Pines Golf Club, Southern Pines
 Pine Needles Golf Club, Southern Pines
 Southern Pines Golf Club, Southern Pines
 Tryon Country Club, Tryon
 Waynesville Country Club Inn, Waynesville
 Cape Fear Country Club, Wilmington
 Wilmington Municipal Golf Course, Wilmington
 Forsyth Country Club, Winston-Salem
 Farmville Country Club

Ohio 

 Acacia Country Club, Lyndhurst (Course was closed in 2013 & converted to public greenspace. Reported by James Ewinger, The Plain Dealer on October 11, 2012 at 10:20 AM, updated October 11, 2012 at 8:56 PM)
 Athens Country Club, Athens
 Avon Fields Golf Course, Cincinnati 
 Brookside Country Club, Canton - Brookside of Canton is a Don Ross design
 Chillicothe Country Club, Chillicothe
 Oakwood Club, Cleveland Heights (Course closed and turned into a shopping center)
 Scioto Country Club, Columbus
 Dayton Country Club, Dayton
 Lancaster Country Club, Lancaster
 Miami Valley Golf Club, Dayton
 Delaware Country Club (formerly Dornoch), Delaware
 Denison Golf Club at Granville (formerly Granville Golf Course), Granville
 Hamilton Elks Country Club,  Hamilton (designed by WC Jackson in 1923)   Confirmed to NOT be a Ross course by the Donald Ross Society in the 2022 course list revision page 3.
 Hawthorne Valley Golf Club, Solon Closed permanently in 2019 (designed by Frank H. Pelton and F. T. Stafford)  Confirmed to NOT be a Ross course by the Donald Ross Society in the 2022 course list revision page 3.
 Congress Lake Club, Hartville
 Westbrook Country Club, Mansfield
 Piqua Country Club, Piqua
 Portsmouth Elks Country Club, McDermott
 Shaker Heights Country Club, Shaker Heights
 Mohawk Golf Club (Original/Back 9), Tiffin
 Inverness Club, Toledo
 Manakiki Golf Course (Cleveland Metroparks), Willoughby Hills
 Mill Creek Park Golf Course, Youngstown
 Columbus Country Club, Columbus
 Miami Shores Golf Course, Troy
 Youngstown Country Club, Youngstown
 Springfield Country Club, Springfield
 Hyde Park Country Club, Cincinnati
 Zanesville Country Club, Zanesville
 Maketewah Country Club, Cincinnati, OH
Kenwood Country Club (Kendale & Kenview) Cincinnati, OH  Home - Kenwood Country Club

Pennsylvania 
Allegheny Country Club, Sewickley Heights
Bedford Springs Hotel, Bedford
Elkview Country Club, Greenfield Township
 Buck Hill Falls Golf Club, Buck Hill Falls
 Tumblebrook, Coopersburg
 Edgewood Country Club, Churchill
 Kahkwa Club, Fairview (Erie)
 Steel Club, Hellertown
 Kennett Square Golf and Country Club, Kennett Square
 McCall Field Golf and Country Club
 Gulph Mills Golf Club
Rolling Rock Club, Laughlintown
 Immergrun Golf Club, Loretto on the campus of Saint Francis University
 Aronimink Golf Club, Newtown Square
 Jeffersonville Golf Club, Norristown
 "Legendary" Lulu Country Club, North Hills
 Schuylkill Country Club, Orwigsburg
 The Union League Golf Club at Torresdale, Philadelphia
 Pocono Manor Golf Course (East Course), Pocono Manor
 Green Oaks Country Club, Verona
 Conewango Valley Country Club, Warren
 St. Davids Golf Club, Wayne
 Country Club of York, York
 Lu Lu Country Club, Glenside, Pennsylvania
 Lewistown Country Club Original 9 holes (Lewistown, PA)
 Flourtown Country Club, Flourtown, PA

Rhode Island 
 Rhode Island Country Club, Barrington
 Metacomet Country Club, East Providence
 Sakonnet Golf Club, Little Compton
 Point Judith Country Club, Narragansett
 Triggs Memorial Golf Course, Providence
 Agawam Hunt, Rumford
 Wannamoisett Country Club, Rumford
 Goddard Memorial State Park, Warwick
 Warwick Country Club, Warwick
 The Misquamicut Club, Watch Hill
 Winnapaug Golf Course, Westerly

South Carolina 
 Fort Mill Golf Club (9 holes), Fort Mill
 Lancaster Golf Club (9 holes), Lancaster
 Camden Country Club, Camden
 Moree's Country Club (19 holes), Cheraw
Dogwood hills. Walterboro South Carolina. 9 holes

Tennessee 
 Brainerd Golf Club, Chattanooga
 Chattanooga Golf and Country Club, Chattanooga
 Ridgefields Country Club, Kingsport
 Cherokee Country Club, Knoxville
 Holston Hills Country Club, Knoxville
 Memphis Country Club, Memphis
 Belle Meade Country Club, Nashville
 Original Richland Country Club, Nashville 
 Shelby Golf Club, Nashville
 Tate Springs Country Club, Bean Station, Tennessee (closed to TVA flooding in 1942)

Texas 
 River Oaks Country Club, Houston
 Sunset Grove Country Club, Orange

Vermont 
Burlington Country Club, Burlington

Virginia 
 Country Club of Virginia (Westhampton Course), Richmond 
 Washington Golf & Country Club, Arlington
 Army Navy Country Club, Arlington
 Kinderton Country Club, Clarksville
 Danville Golf Club, Danville
 The Woodlands Golf Course, Hampton
 Lakeside Park Club, Henrico County
 The Homestead (The Old Course), Hot Springs
 Woodberry Forest School (9-hole course)
Sewells Point, Norfolk

Wisconsin 
 Kenosha Country Club, Kenosha
 Oconomowoc Golf Club, Oconomowoc

References 

 
Ross, Donald